Kurt Mørkøre (born 20 February 1969) is a former Faroese football midfielder or striker who is currently manager of the Norwegian club Averøykameratene. He is the elder brother of fellow Faroese international Allan Mørkøre. He is a baker by profession.

Club career
A versatile midfielder or striker, he started his career at Faroese club KÍ Klaksvík and stayed there for most of his career alongside his brother Allan. Also, he teamed up with compatriot Julian Johnsson at Norwegian league side Sogndal Fotball and he played at Norwegian lower-league Skarbøvik IF. Mørkøre was Faroese league top goalscorer in the 1988 and 1996 seasons.

International career
Mørkøre made his debut in an August 1988 friendly match against Iceland, the country's first FIFA-recognized match. His final match was an October 2001 World Cup qualifying match against Slovenia. He earned 37 caps, scoring 3 goals.

International goals
Scores and results list Faroe Islands' goal tally first.

References

External links
 
 
 Profile at B68

1969 births
Living people
Faroese footballers
Faroe Islands international footballers
Sogndal Fotball players
Faroese football managers
Expatriate footballers in Norway
Eliteserien players
KÍ Klaksvík players
EB/Streymur players
Faroese expatriates in Norway
People from Klaksvík
B36 Tórshavn managers
KÍ Klaksvík managers
Association football forwards
Association football midfielders